Azad Hind Manch ( Free Indian Platform) is an organization of rebels from the Forward Bloc who have resigned or been expelled from the party for questioning the "undemocratic functioning" and ideological deviations of the leadership. On June 21, 2022, the Azad Hind Manch was formed under the leadership of Ali Imran Ramz and other rebels.

“The red flag with the image of a leaping tiger with a hammer and sickle is the original flag” is which they will carry forward. They have called for an ideological struggle against the "imposition" of the absurd doctrine of "Subhasvad" on the party workers. Now all the leadership joined the Congress, as they were not invited elitely by any of the Left parties.

Activities
On June 22, when the Forward Bloc called for the hoisting of the new flag, rebels celebrated the foundation day of the AIFB with the original flag in about 10 districts of the state.
On June 25, a civil protest march called by the Left Front in Calcutta demanding the release of Teesta Setalvad did not show any front-line leaders of the Forward Bloc, but the 'Azad Hind Manch' of rebels led by Ali Imran Ramz (Victor) arrived there to join it. Victor told Biman Bose that they want to continue with the Left Front.
On July 22, they held a memorial meeting for Dr. Barun Mukherji who passed away on July 10 at Bharat Sabha Hall. AHM leader Sudip Banerjee said “We think there are two main reasons behind the formation of Azad Hind Manch.  First, integrity of leadership and second, ideals. Dr. Barun Mukherjee is our leader in both these matters. His integrity is unquestionable. Which today's leadership does not even have a drop.“
On July 29, although earlier Azad Hind Manch meetings were held in various districts, the first meeting was held at the district office of the Forward Bloc in Chakulia, the base of rebel leader Victor.
On July 30, AHM participated in the 'Chor Dharo Jail Bharo' program with the CPIM in Chankulia.
On September 12, under the banner of the Bankura Area Committee, the Communist Party of India (Marxist) along with the Azad Hind Manch organized a joint anti-corruption deputation in the panchayat with massive crowds.

References

2022 establishments in India
Left-wing politics in India